The 2015 Omsk building collapse occurred on 12 July 2015 at a military facility on the outskirts of Omsk, Russia. 23 soldiers died and another 19 were injured after a roof and walls of an army barracks building collapsed at the 242nd Training Centre of the Airborne Forces.

References

2015 disasters in Russia
Building collapses in 2015
Omsk
21st-century military history of Russia
Building collapses in Russia
Man-made disasters in Russia